Cerva may refer to:

People
 Cerva family, a noble family from Ragusa (modern Dubrovnik, Croatia)
 Cerva (surname), surname

Places
 Cerva, Calabria, Italy
 Cerva e Limões, Portugal

Other
 Adriana La Cerva, character in The Sopranos
 Cerva CE.43 Guépard
 CERVA, French aircraft manufacturer